Cherry Twister was a power pop band consisting of musicians Steve Ward, Ross Sackler and Michael Giblin.  The band began early 1993 from the ashes of Harrisburg-based band 23 Skidoo which included Steve Ward, Ross Sackler, Dave Sheaffer and Joe Pisapia. Pisapia went on to form Nashville-based Joe, Marc's Brother. Ward and Sackler recorded their lo-fi bedroom-recording and was released on Planet Earthy in 1993; guitarist Michael Giblin signed on for the follow-up, 1999's At Home With Cherry Twister. At Home With Cherry Twister gained an entry in the Top 200 powerpop lists of 1999.

Steve Ward moved to a solo career, recording several CDs. Mike Giblin moved on to Parallax Project and released three CDs titled Oblivious, Perpetual Limbo and I Hate Girls. He then went on to form The Split Squad, with Clem Burke of Blondie, Josh Kantor of The Baseball Project, Eddie Munoz of The Plimsouls and Keith Steng of The Fleshtones.  They have toured nationally, as well as in France and Spain.  To date the group has released one album, "Now Hear This..." in 2014.  Ross Sackler joined up with Dave Aufiero and John Fritchey from The Polins and Mike Pasariello from Wayne Supergenius to form Peabody and released a self-titled CD.

On Saturday, February 19, 2011, Cherry Twister reunited on stage for the first time in 13 years to perform at the 2nd Annual Susan Giblin Foundation For Animal Wellness and Welfare Benefit to a sold-out capacity crowd.

Albums

Cherry Twister
First album, 1993, self-titled.

Track listing
 You'd Rather See Me Lonely
 Fond
 Rose Garden
 Angeline
 Catch Me
 Mrs. Hall
 My Love
 Neverai
 We Float About
 This Man
 I'd Like To Fall In Love
 Sailing

At Home With Cherry Twister

Track listing
 Don't Forget Your Man
 Sparkle
 Meteorite
 Charlotte B.
 I'm Gonna Be The Lonely Boy Tonite
 American Nightlife
 Leila
 She's Gone
 Maryann
 Black Summer
 Brighten Up
 Kinda Like A Star
 She's In Love Again
 Til I'm Blue
 Careful (Can't Fall Again)
 Why Won't You Believe In Me?

Compilation albums

Come and Get It: A Tribute to Badfinger

Track listing
 Come and Get It - Adrian Belew
 Perfection - Parthenon Huxley
 We're for the Dark - Loud Family
 Flying - Cotton Mather
 It's Over - Brad Jones
 No Matter What - The Knack
 Day After Day - 20/20
 Midnight Caller - Chris Von Sneidern
 Baby Blue - Aimee Mann
 Lonely You - Bill Lloyd
 Name of the Game - Cockeyed Ghost
 It Had to Be - Cherry Twister
 Know One Knows - Solteens
 I Can't Take It - Dwight Twilley
 Suitcase - The Plimsouls
 Get Away - The Rooks
 Just a Chance - Circle Sky
 I'll Be the One - Erik Voeks
 Better Days - Walter Clevenger
 Icicles - Paranoid Lovesick
 Maybe Tomorrow - Al Kooper
 Apple of My Eye - Derrek Van Eaton, Lon VanEaton

Yellow Pills, Vol. 3

Track listing
 Her Majesty's Buzz - Penelope Baker
 Do What You're Doing - Michael Guthrie Band
 The Problem With Jill - Material Issue
 The Blunderbuss - Brad Jones
 Nobody I Know - Martin Luther Lennon
 Her Stars Are My Stars - John Wicks
 Skyvue - The Finns
 Taking Me Somewhere - John McMullan
 Weird Sister - Gigolo Aunts
 Just in Time - Black and Blonde
 You Know the Real - Greenberry Woods
 Pt. 1 - The Blow Pops
 Dear Prudence - Feet of Clay
 Skidmarks - Wonderboy
 I've Always Got You on My Mind - Paul Collins' Beat
 This Can't Go On - The Scruffs
 Time Will Tell on You - Rock Club
 Blue Summer - Cherry Twister
 Be the One - Something Happens
 Nobody Knows - Scott McCarl
 Let's Take a Chance - Craig Pearman

Bucketfull of Brains, 50th Anniversary CD

Track listing
 Jewel Of My Heart - Dan Penn
 Too Late - Jim Dickinson
 You Are My Entirety - Jolene
 It's Hard To Be A Rebel (No World) - Dwight Twilley
 I Had It Right The First Time - Bill Lloyd
 There's No One In This City - Tommy Keene
 Bold Moves - Matthew Sweet
 Gurls - Junior Cottonmouth
 Home To You - Bronco Bullfrog
 Sunrise - Zero Willpower
 Trapped - Daryll-Ann
 Adult Child - Barracudas
 Olivia 101 - Frank Bango & The Magic Fingers
 I'm Not A Joker (For Diana) - The Rooks
 The Water Song - Skooshny
 Maryann - Cherry Twister
 Bring The Ole Sun Down - You Am I
 London - Sparklehorse
 Tossin' And Turnin' - Radio Sweethearts

Coming up! Independent artists pay tribute to the music of Paul McCartney

Track listing
 Let 'em in - Starbelly
 Take it away - The Jellybricks
 Every night - Mark Bacino
 This one - Cliff Hillis
 My brave face - Star Collector
 Temporary secretary - The Andersons
 Mull of Kintyre - Kyf Brewer
 With a little luck - The Masticators
 Somedays - Phil Keaggy
 Getting closer - Michael Carpenter
 Maybe I'm amazed - Gadget White Band
 Helen Wheels - The Shazam
 Oh woman, oh why - Ray Paul
 Another day - Cherry Twister
 Back on my feet - Cockeyed Ghost

Notes
 At Home With Cherry Twister at Billboard.com
 [ Yellow Pills, Vol. 3 at Billboard.com]
 FROM DEMO TO CULT STATUS at The Record
  LET'S (NOT) TWIST AGAIN Intelligencer Journal
 POST-MODERN IRONY? RETRO-TECH CHIC? NAH, IT'S PURE POP Intelligencer Journal
Power Pop Criminals, Cherry Twister
Bucketfull Of Brains, 50th Anniversary CD
Amazon, Cherry Twister
Power of Pop, "Steve Ward"

References

American power pop groups